The foxfish, Bodianus frenchii, is a species of wrasse native to the temperate marine waters in southwestern Western Australia to eastern South Australia, and from southern Queensland to eastern Tasmania, at depths  between 10 and 40 m.  A gap in the distribution of foxfish occurs through Victoria. Its length is up to 45 cm.

Description
The foxfish is brown, red, or orange with two spots on the back. When foxfish are juveniles, they are brown and have three yellow patches with a black area around the pectoral fin.

Habitat and biology
Foxfish are typically found living under ledges and in caves. It is a long lived species which may attain ages of 60 or more years. Foxfish are protogynous hermaphrodites, and they spawn several times during the late spring and the summer. They form distinct pairs when breeding.

Human uses
The foxfish is caught as bycatch in trawl fisheries off the coasts of New South Wales and Western Australia. In Western Australia it is a quarry for recreational anglers and the state applies bag limits. It is also taken for the aquarium trade and is prized in the United States.

Taxonomy and etymology
Bodianus frenchii was formally described in 1879 as Cossyphus frenchii by Carl Benjamin Klunzinger with the type locality given as King George Sound, Western Australia.  The specific name honours Herr French, who was an assistant to Dr V. Muller, who was the collector of many types of Australian fishes described by Klunzinger. The vernacular name, "foxfish", is thought to be taken from the misapplied binomial Bodianus vulpinus, as to most eyes this fish bears no resemblance to a fox.

There is a gap in the distribution of the foxfish off the coast of Victoria and the eastern and western populations show morphological differences and may be separated into different species.

References

Sources
 
 

Foxfish
Taxa named by Carl Benjamin Klunzinger
Fish described in 1880